The Diprionidae are a small family of conifer-feeding sawflies (thus the common name conifer sawflies, though other Symphyta also feed on conifers) restricted to the Northern Hemisphere, with some 140 species in 13 genera. Larvae are often gregarious, and sometimes there can be major outbreaks, thus these sawflies can be major forest pests at times. These sawflies have the ability to compromise the health and ecological balance of forests. When the temperatures begin to rise, the sawflies become strengthened pests to these conifers. In doing so, they cause damage to a certain extent. 

The family has distinctive antennae with about 20 flagellomeres. Males have pectinate antennae and females have serrate antennae.

Genera
These 13 genera belong to the family Diprionidae:

 Augomonoctenus Rohwer, 1918
 Diprion Schrank, 1802
 Gilpinia Benson, 1939
 Macrodiprion Enslin, 1914
 Microdiprion Enslin, 1914
 Monoctenus Dahlbom, 1835
 Neodiprion Rohwer, 1918
 Nesodiprion Rohwer, 1910
 Prionomeion Benson, 1939
 Rhipidoctenus Benson, 1954
 Zadiprion Rohwer, 1918
 † Eodiprion Schedl, 2007
 † Paleomonoctenus Nel, 2004

References

External links
 Neodiprion spp. on the UF / IFAS  Featured Creatures Web site

Tenthredinoidea
Sawfly families